Sheikh Ijaz Ahmad is a Pakistani politician who was a Member of the Provincial Assembly of the Punjab, from 2002 to 2007 and again from May 2013 to May 2018.

Early life and education
He was born on 20 June 1969 in Faisalabad.

He received a degree of Bachelor of Arts and a degree of Bachelor of Laws, both from the University of Punjab.

Political career
He was elected to the Provincial Assembly of the Punjab as a candidate of Pakistan Muslim League (N) (PML-N) from Constituency PP-72 (Faisalabad-XXII) in 2002 Pakistani general election. He received 20,586 votes and defeated a candidate of Pakistan Peoples Party (PPP).

He was re-elected to the Provincial Assembly of the Punjab as a candidate of PML-N from Constituency PP-68 (Faisalabad-XVIII) in 2013 Pakistani general election.

References

Living people
Punjab MPAs 2013–2018
Punjab MPAs 2002–2007
1969 births
Pakistan Muslim League (N) politicians